Collinias is a genus of flies belonging to the family Pipunculidae.

Species
Collinias croceus Skevington, 2006
Collinias dolabratus Skevington, 2006
Collinias fulvicaudus De Meyer, 1996
Collinias heterostigmus (Perkins, 1905)
Collinias imparilis (Hardy, 1968)
Collinias leechi (Hardy, 1972)
Collinias limitaris (Collin, 1929)
Collinias schlingeri Skevington, 2006
Collinias vitiensis (Muir, 1906)

References

Pipunculidae
Brachycera genera
Diptera of Asia
Diptera of Africa